William Anthony O'Neill (born 29 December 1919, date of death unknown) was an Irish professional footballer who played as a midfielder.

Sources

References

1919 births
Date of death unknown
Association football forwards
Association footballers from Cork (city)
Belfast Celtic F.C. players
Burnley F.C. players
Chelmsford City F.C. players
Cork United F.C. (1940–1948) players
English Football League players
Republic of Ireland association footballers
Walsall F.C. players